Renata Jaworska (born 1979 in Zwoleń, Poland) is a Polish contemporary visual artist. She lives and works in Düsseldorf and Salem, Germany.

Early life and education 
While still a student of the Józef Chelmoński High School of Fine Arts in Nałęczów, Jaworska visited the exhibition "Znaki, symbolei wizje"(Sings, Symbols and Visions) by Jörg Immendorff at the National Museum in Warsaw in 1998. This influenced the choice of her future academy and master. After graduating from high school at 19 she was accepted at the Kunstakademie Düsseldorf and she moved to Germany to study.

Jaworska studied painting in Immendorff's class at the Kunstakademie Düsseldorf, from which she graduated.

During her studies she designed the stage set for the one-act operatic monologue La voix humaine, by Jean Cocteau and Francis Poulenc. This project was created as part of the collaboration between the Kunstakademie Düsseldorf, Robert Schumann Hochschule Düsseldorf and the Deutsche Oper am Rhein. The opera was performed in the auditorium of the Kunstakademie Düsseldorf in 2002 after the opening speech for the Rundgang by the rector of Kunstakademie Düsseldorf, Markus Lüpertz.

Work  
Since 2017 Renata Jaworska has been dealing with literary works. Her exhibition "Maps and Territories" (Les carter et les territories based on the novel by Michel Houellebecq) at Biuro Wystaw Artystycznych w Kielcach  showed series of the paintings with the theme. In Jaworska's work, the maps are her source material to deal with questions of belonging through the topographies and districts. The starting point for her was the map material that, thanks to the Internet and smartphones, is now available in all conceivable scales and sections, even of the most remote corners of the earth. To prepare for a trip, it is still a good idea to study the maps of the unknown territory. To get an idea of what to expect by looking at the roads, borders and topographic areas, to plan your route and look for the fastest, shortest, most interesting way. It is a form of appropriation of the previously foreign territory.

At Galeria 58, she showed a series of works created for this exhibition. She investigated the relation between sound and space. She was looking for answers about belonging to a certain territory, religion and society. The start for these new works was the bell donated by her great-great-grandfather Jan Skrzypczak to the garrison church of Sw. Stanislaw in Radom. Between 2018 and 2019, numerous drawings as well as large-scale works on paper are created. Jaworska deals in these years with the theme: "localization". The artist let the viewer of her works look at an area from a bird's eye view, at urban structures, cartographically defined. But they are not scaled down images of a place, although they find their basis in real map material. Urban structures with their streets and areas are clearly recognizable in their layout, but they are not differentiated further.

Jaworska works in a variety of media, including drawing, painting, film, objects and interventions in public spaces. Her works are exhibited internationally, most recently including Kunsthalle Düsseldorf in 2019, 5th Biennale of Drawing in Nuremberg in 2019, Museum of Villingen-Schwenningen, Germany 2019, BWA w Kielcach in 2018, Dumbo Arts Festival , Brooklyn NY in 2014, L'Esposizione Internazionale d'arte "Piccola Germania" Mostra Internazionale, Lido di Venezia in 2009.

Her works are in numerous private and public collections.

Exhibitions 
Beginning with her first institutional show, Von Pferden und Affen, at the Museum Ludwig in Koblenz in 2007, Jaworska also had a solo exhibition at the Romanian Embassy in Warsaw in 2008, super Land, super Rheinland in Museum Ratingen in 2018 and the "Maps and Territories" based on a novel by Michel Houellebecq at the Biuro Wystaw Artystycznych BWA w Kielcach in 2018.

Jaworska received several grants in Germany, Poland, Slovenia, Greece and the US. In 2007 she was a scholarship holder of the Lepsien Art Foundation Luxemburg / UAE. During her stay in London in 2010, she created the video project "119-minute-circle. The International Congress at the Whitechapel Gallery" which was presented at the Kunstmuseum Pablo Picasso in Münster in 2018 as a part of the large-scale project "Peace" and "Rethinking Guernica" at the Museo Reina Sofia, among others. Jaworska was selected for a project in collaboration with, among others, National Museum of Contemporary History MNZS Ljubljana in Slovenia, Galeria Labirynt in Lublin, Poland and National Museum of Contemporary Art Athens EMST in Greece.

References

Further reading 

 Jansen, Gregor (2019) "Ein aus der Orientierung geratenes System. Zu den aktuellen Werken von Renata Jaworska" Text is piece of the book: Renata Jaworska, Malerei, Zeichnung, Bühnenbild, Original Verlag 
 Gaude, Alexander (2018) "Stimme, Bild und Nation" is piece within the book "119-minute circle. The International Congress at the Whitechapel Gallery"  Kunstmuseum Pablo Picasso, Grupello Verlag 
 Zacharko-Łagowska, Stanisława; Monika Cybulska (2018) "Maps and territories" BWA w Kielcach ISBN 978-83-950017-9-6
Renata Jaworska (2015) "Eine Explosion wie von 30 Atombomben" im Städtischen Museum Engen + Galerie / Jaworska, Renata. - Düsseldorf : Grupello, 2015 ISBN 978-3-89978-233-2
Thaler, Jürgen (2012) "Im Auftrag der Schrift" Vorarlberger Landesbibliothek Bregenz, KEHRER Verlag ISBN 978-3-86828-291-7
Kucharko, Agnieszka (2010) Young Polish Art Festival. Deconstruction Project (London, England). OFF Pres, London 
Reifenscheid, Beate (2007) "Klasse Immendorff. Von Pferden und Affen" Verlagsgruppe Geuer und Breckner ISBN 9783 939452-09-6

External links 

 
 Website including CV and works
 Videos about Renata Jaworska
 Renata Jaworska's current projects
 Literature by and about Renata Jaworska in the catalog of the German National Library

1979 births
21st-century Polish women artists
21st-century Polish artists
Modern painters
Polish contemporary artists
Kunstakademie Düsseldorf alumni
Living people
People from Zwoleń County
Polish expatriates in Germany